Cymothoa exigua, or the tongue-eating louse, is a parasitic isopod of the family Cymothoidae. It enters fish through the gills. The female attaches to the tongue, while the male attaches to the gill arches beneath and behind the female. The parasite severs the blood vessels in the fish's tongue, causing the tongue to fall off. It then attaches itself to the remaining stub of tongue and the parasite itself effectively serves as the fish's new "tongue".

Behavior
Using its front claws, C. exigua severs the blood vessels in the fish's tongue, causing the tongue to necrose from lack of blood. The parasite then replaces the fish's tongue by attaching its own body to the muscles of the tongue stub. The parasite apparently does not cause much other damage to the host fish, but  Lanzing and O'Connor (1975) reported that infested fish with two or more of the parasites are usually underweight. Once C. exigua replaces the tongue, some feed on the host's blood and many others feed on fish mucus. This is the only known case of a parasite assumed to be functionally replacing a host organ. When a host fish dies, C. exigua, after some time, detaches itself from the tongue stub and leaves the fish's oral cavity. It can then be seen clinging to its head or body externally. What then happens to the parasite in the wild is unknown.

Many species of Cymothoa have been identified, and only cymothoid isopods are known to consume and replace the host's organs. Other species of isopods known to parasitize fish in this way include C. borbonica and Ceratothoa imbricata. Different cymothoid genera are adapted to specific areas of attachment on the host. This includes scale-clingers, mouth- or gill-dwellers, and flesh-burrowers.

Distribution
C. exigua is quite widespread. It can be found from the Gulf of California southward to north of the Gulf of Guayaquil, Ecuador, as well as in parts of the Atlantic. This isopod is known to parasitize eight species in two orders and four families of fishes—seven species of order Perciformes: three snappers (Lutjanidae), one species of grunt (Haemulidae), three drums (Sciaenidae), and one species of order Atheriniformes: one grunion (Atherinidae). New hosts from Costa Rica include the Colorado snapper, Lutjanus colorado and Jordan's snapper, L. jordani.

In 2005, a red snapper parasitized by what could be C. exigua was discovered in the United Kingdom. As the parasite is normally found south of the Gulf of California, Mexico, this led to speculation that the parasite's range may be expanding; however,  the isopod possibly traveled from the Gulf of California in the snapper's mouth, and its appearance in the UK was an isolated incident.

Reproduction
Not much is known about the lifecycle of C. exigua. It exhibits sexual reproduction. The species starts as a juvenile in a short, free-living stage in the water column. Juveniles likely first attach to the gills of a fish and become males. As they mature, they become females, with mating likely occurring on the gills. The fertilized eggs are held in a marsupium, similar to a kangaroo. The female then makes her way to the fish's mouth, where she uses her front claws to attach to the fish's tongue.

Influence on humans
C. exigua is not believed to be harmful to humans, except it may bite if separated from its host and handled.

In Puerto Rico, C. exigua was the leading subject of a lawsuit against a large supermarket chain; it is found in snappers from the Eastern Pacific, which are shipped worldwide for commercial consumption. The customer in the lawsuit claimed to have been poisoned by eating an isopod cooked inside a snapper. The case, however, was dropped on the grounds that isopods are not poisonous to humans and some are even consumed as part of a regular diet.

In popular media
 An image of three clown fish, each with a parasitic isopod visible in its mouth, was shortlisted in the underwater category of the 2017 Wildlife Photographer of the Year competition of the Natural History Museum, London.
 In the 2022 surrealist horror game, How Fish Is Made, a parasitic isopod uses its host fish as a mouthpiece. Interacting with this host will trigger a cutscene in which the isopod performs a song and dance.

References

External links
Images and discussion

Cymothoida
Parasitic crustaceans
Crustaceans of the eastern Pacific Ocean
Crustaceans described in 1884
Taxa named by Jørgen Matthias Christian Schiødte
Tongue disorders
Xenotransplantation
Parasites of fish